Lynne McMahon is an American poet.

She graduated from University of Utah with a PhD in 1982.  She teaches at University of Missouri,
Her work has appeared in The New York Times Book Review, New Virginia Review, American Poetry Review, The Southern Review, The New Yorker, The Atlantic Monthly, The Nation, Partisan Review, Poetry, The New Republic, Rolling Stone, The Yale Review, The New England Review and The Paris Review.

Awards
 Award for Literary Excellence from the American Academy of Arts and Letters
 1995 Guggenheim Fellowship
 Ingram Merrill Foundation fellowship
 Missouri Arts Council grant

Works
"On Deciding To Fire My Chiropractor", Slate, Jan. 28, 2003
"Birthday Poem", The Nation
"Convalescence", The American Poetry Review Vol. 18 No. 3
 Faith (Wesleyan University Press, 1988) 
 Devolution of the Nude (David R. Godine, 1993) 
 The House of Entertaining Science (David R. Godine, 1999) 
 Sentimental Standards (David R. Godine, 2004)

Anthologies
"We Take Our Children to Ireland", Poets of the New Century, Editors Roger Weingarten, Richard Higgerson, David R. Godine Publisher, 2001, 
"We Take Our Children to Ireland", The Best American Poetry 2000, Editors Rita Dove, David Lehman, Simon and Schuster, 2000, 
"Barbie's Ferrari", Poetry 180: a turning back to poetry, Editor Billy Collins, Random House Trade Paperbacks, 2003, 
"Wedding Ring", 180 more: extraordinary poems for every day, Editor Billy Collins, Random House, Inc., 2005, 
"Not Falling", The extraordinary tide: new poetry by American women, Editors Susan Aizenberg, Erin Belieu, Jeremy Countryman, Columbia University Press, 2001,

References

External links
"Poetry in Motion: Lynne McMahon takes flight at The Side Project", New City Stage

University of Utah alumni
University of Missouri faculty
Living people
American women poets
Year of birth missing (living people)
American women academics
21st-century American women